This a list of films produced or distributed by Relativity Media, an American media company.

2000s

2010s

2020s

References

General

Other

Relativity Media
 

id:Daftar film Relativity Media